A  is a form of Japanese pagoda found primarily at Esoteric Shingon and Tendai school Buddhist temples. It is unique among pagodas because it has an even number of stories (two). (The second story has a balustrade and seems habitable, but is nonetheless inaccessible and offers no usable space.) Its name alludes to Tahō Nyorai, who appears seated in a many-jewelled pagoda in the eleventh chapter of the Lotus Sutra. With square lower and cylindrical upper parts, a mokoshi 'skirt roof', a pyramidal roof, and a finial, the tahōtō or the larger daitō was one of the seven halls of a Shingon temple. After the Heian period, the construction of pagodas in general declined, and new tahōtō became rare. Six examples, of which that at Ishiyama-dera (1194) is the earliest, have been designated National Treasures.
There are no examples in China, whether architectural or pictorial, of anything that resembles the tahōtō, although there is a Song dynasty textual reference to a 'tahōtō with an encircling chamber'.

Hōtō
The  or treasure pagoda is the ancestor of the tahōtō and dates to the introduction to Japan of Shingon and Tendai Buddhism in the ninth century. No wooden hōtō has survived, albeit modern copies do exist, and stone, bronze, or iron, and specimens are always miniatures comprising a foundation stone, barrel-shaped body, pyramid roof, and a finial.

Daitō

This is the only type of tahōtō to retain the original structure with a row of pillars or a wall separating the corridor (hisashi) from the core of the structure, abolished in smaller pagodas.  Daitō used to be common but, of all those ever built, only a few are still extant. One is at Wakayama prefecture's Negoro-ji, another at Kongōbu-ji, again in Wakayama, another at Kirihata-dera, Tokushima prefecture, another at Narita-san in Chiba. (See the respective list entries.) Kūkai himself, founder of the Shingon school, built the celebrated daitō for Kongōbu-ji on Kōyasan; almost fifty metres high, chronicles relate that 'the mightiness of its single storey outdoes that of multi-storeyed pagodas'. The specimen found at Negoro-ji (see photo above) is 30.85 meters tall and a National Treasure.

Structure

Single-storey
Japanese pagodas have an odd number of stories. While the tahōto may appear to be twin-storied, complete with balustrade, the upper part is inaccessible with no usable space. The lower roof, known as a mokoshi, provides shelter and the appearance of an additional storey.

Floor plan
The main objects of worship are often enshrined within.

Upper part
Above is a second 'tortoise mound', in a residual reference to the stupa. Since exposed plaster weathers rapidly, a natural solution was to provide it with a roof, the mokoshi. Above again is a short, cylindrical section and a pyramidal roof, supported on four-stepped brackets.

Finial

This comprises the base or 'dew basin'; an inverted bowl with attached lotus petals; nine rings; 'water flame'; and jewel. The finial's division in sections has a symbolic meaning and its structure as a whole itself represents a pagoda.

Miniature versions
A number of smaller versions of the tahōtō are known, of stone, bronze, iron, or wood, and similar to the hōtō.

Meaning
A number of mandala show the Iron Stupa in southern India, where the patriarch Nāgārjuna received the Esoteric scriptures, as a single-storey pagoda with a cylindrical body, a pyramidal roof, and a spire. The forms used in the tahōtō, namely the square, circle, triangle, semi-circle, and circle, may represent the Five Elements or the Five Virtues. The egg-shaped stupa mound or aṇḍa may represent Mount Sumeru, with the finial as the axis of the world; or, by a folk interpretation, the square base may represents a folded robe, the dome an overturned begging bowl, and the spire a walking staff. The tahōtō served not as a reliquary tower but often as an icon hall.

Examples

See also

 Tō
 List of National Treasures of Japan (temples)
 Pagoda
 Stupa

References

 02
Japanese architectural history
Buddhism in the Heian period